Carly Calder Cole (née Zucker; born 11 May 1984) is a British reality television contestant, fitness trainer and model, and wife of former professional footballer Joe Cole.

Media career
Cole has modelled for fitness and fashion magazines. She was a contestant on the reality TV show I'm a Celebrity... Get Me out of Here! in 2008, and was the third person voted out on 28 November.  In 2009 she was the face of a Lynx campaign.

Personal life
Cole is of German and English heritage. She grew up in Leytonstone, East London, and attended Wanstead High School.  She has always had an interest in sport, having played football at school. She is also an avid runner and a yoga enthusiast.

Carly married England footballer Joe Cole on 20 June 2009 in Chelsea, London, wearing a £10,000 wedding dress by designer Oscar de la Renta. The couple have a daughter, Ruby Tatiana Cole, born in March 2010 in London, and a son, Harrison, born 19 October 2012, also in London. On 18 October 2015, she had their third child, a boy named Max.

References

External links
 

1984 births
Living people
Association footballers' wives and girlfriends
People from Leytonstone
People from Rhyl
I'm a Celebrity...Get Me Out of Here! (British TV series) participants